Andrew Robert Thorpe (born October 1, 2000) is an American baseball pitcher in the New York Yankees organization.

Amateur career
Thorpe grew up in Washington, Utah and attended Desert Hills High School. He played summer collegiate baseball after graduating high school for the Peninsula Oilers of the Alaska Baseball League.

Thorpe made four starts and went 1–1 with a 3.21 ERA during his freshman season before it was cut short due to the coronavirus pandemic. As a sophomore, he posted a 6–6 record with 3.79 ERA and 104 strikeouts in  innings pitched. After the 2021 season, Thorpe played for the Yarmouth-Dennis Red Sox of the Cape Cod Baseball League. He was named the Big West Conference Pitcher of the Year as a junior after posting a 10–1 record with a 2.32 ERA and 149 strikeouts in  innings pitched.

Professional career 
The New York Yankees selected Thorpe in the second round, with the 61st overall selection, in the 2022 Major League Baseball draft. He signed with the team on July 25, 2022, and received a $1.187 million signing bonus.

References

External links

Cal Poly Mustangs bio

Living people
Baseball players from Utah
Baseball pitchers
Cal Poly Mustangs baseball players
Yarmouth–Dennis Red Sox players
2000 births
All-American college baseball players
Peninsula Oilers players
People from Washington County, Utah